is a Tōji Shingon temple in Itano, Tokushima Prefecture, Japan. Temple 4 on the Shikoku 88 temple pilgrimage, the main image is of Dainichi Nyorai. The temple is said to have been founded by Kōbō Daishi, who carved the image.

See also

 Aizen-in
 Shikoku 88 temple pilgrimage

References

Buddhist pilgrimage sites in Japan
Buddhist temples in Tokushima Prefecture
Tōji Shingon temples